David Cesarani  (13 November 1956 – 25 October 2015) was a British historian who specialised in Jewish history, especially the Holocaust.  He also wrote several biographies, including Arthur Koestler: The Homeless Mind (1998).

Early life and education

Cesarani was born in London to Henry, a hairdresser, and Sylvia (née Packman).  An only child, he won a scholarship to Latymer Upper School in west London and went to Queens' College, Cambridge, in 1976, where he gained a first in history.  A master's degree in Jewish history at Columbia University, New York, working with the scholar of Judaism Arthur Hertzberg, shaped the rest of his career.  His doctorate at St Antony's College, Oxford, looked into aspects of the history of the interwar Anglo-Jewish community.

Before he started his degree at Cambridge, Cesarani spent a gap year in Israel which involved working at a kibbutz.  His involvement in Zionism was to be accompanied by nagging doubts that arose from this period, where he observed local Arabs were not accorded respect.  He recalled the shock he felt on discovering that the kibbutzniks had not been forthcoming about the history of the fields where he worked, near Qaqun.  "We were always told that the pile of rubble at the top of the hill was a Crusader castle.  It was only much later that I discovered it was an Arab village that had been ruined in the Six-Day war."

Academic career
Cesarani held positions at the University of Leeds, Queen Mary University of London and at the Wiener Library in London, where he was director for two periods in the 1990s.  He was professor of Modern Jewish history at the University of Southampton from 2000 to 2004, and research professor in history at Royal Holloway, University of London, from 2004 until his death.  Here he helped establish and direct the Holocaust Research Centre.

The Arendt affair

In 2005, he published a biography of SS-Obersturmbannführer Adolf Eichmann; titled Eichmann: His Life and Crimes, it featured hitherto unused primary source material.  The book has gained attention in particular for its evaluation of Hannah Arendt's account of Eichmann's arrest, trial and sentence.  In a review for The Daily Telegraph, British historian Ian Kershaw wrote that "a central purpose of Cesarani's penetrating and compelling study is to show how wrong Arendt's influential interpretation of Eichmann was, and how misleading the phrase 'banality of evil' has proved."  A key charge of Cesarani was that Arendt's account of Eichmann's trial was hindered by prejudice towards the Eastern European Jewish background of the prosecutor, Gideon Hausner.

Kershaw commended Cesarani's "expert guidance through the web of lies, deceit, and contradictions built into Eichmann's various tendentious accounts of his life and career.  He hammers home the message that, far from being merely an industrious underling dispassionately implementing orders, Eichmann was a convinced anti-Semitic ideologue in a key position where he himself could initiate action and make things happen."  He described Cesarani's "revision of Arendt's interpretation" of Eichmann as "an unideological bureaucrat diligently doing his job, the archetypal middle-manager on the lookout for career advancement, but otherwise without motive – 'the classic desk-killer who mechanically and thoughtlessly arranged for millions to die as the culmination of a routinised and sanitised process or destruction'" as "surely correct".

Criticising an influential and much-admired writer as Hannah Arendt raised controversy.  An editor of The New York Times Book Review, Barry Gewen, while praising the "factual density" in Cesarani's book, dismissed what he described as Cesarani's "hostility" to Arendt and even suggested that Cesarani needed to "tear Arendt down to make space for himself."  He further said that "Cesarani believes his details add up to a portrait at odds with Arendt's banal bureaucrat, but what is striking is how far his research goes to reinforce her fundamental arguments."  He characterised Cesarani's statement, "She had much in common with Eichmann.  There were two people in the courtroom who looked up to the German-born judges as the best of Germany and looked down on the prosecutor as a miserable Ostjude: one was Eichmann and the other was Hannah Arendt," as a "slur" which "reveals a writer in control neither of his material nor of himself."

Public activism

Holocaust consciousness
Cesarani was a member of the Home Office' Holocaust Memorial Day Strategic Group and was once Director of the AHRC Parkes Centre, part of the Parkes Institute for the Study of Jewish/non-Jewish Relations.  He was co-editor of the journal Patterns of Prejudice and the Parkes-Wiener Series of books on Jewish Studies (published by Vallentine-Mitchell).  In February 2005, Cesarani was awarded an OBE for "services to Holocaust Education and advising the government with regard to the establishment of Holocaust Memorial Day".

Cesarani campaigned against Holocaust deniers such as David Irving and Fredrick Töben, alongside fellow academic Peter Longerich. With regards to Holocaust denial, he wrote that "the fractional loss of liberty entailed in penalising the expression of neo-Nazi views or Holocaust denial seems a small price to pay compared to what can follow if the far right is shielded all the way into power".  Journalist David Guttenplan described Cesarani's position in the wake of the Irving v Lipstadt trial as "more dangerous than anything David Irving has ever said or written."

Israeli–Arab conflict and Zionism
Cesarani believed that Israel's right to exist is unquestionable, and that "[d]enying the right of Israel to exist begs some serious questions."  He was strongly critical of academic and business boycotts against Israel in the United Kingdom.  However he was also critical of Israeli government policy, conduct and expansionist sentiments.

He was an advisory editor of Engage, a web-based campaign that emerged from opposition to the Association of University Teachers (AUT) boycott. In his words Engage was "careful to stress that criticism of Israel's Government or Israeli society is not a priori anti-Semitic.  What Engage objects to is the demonisation of Israel, the application of double standards intended to criminalise one state and those who support it, and the unique denial to the Jews of any right to nationhood."  Cesarani decried anti-Semitic incidents and expressions in relation to the boycotts in British universities as well as the "apathy" of student bodies such as the National Union of Students. Cesarani concluded "It should not be like this.  It is possible to support the Palestinian struggle against the occupation and for a viable state without endorsing the murder of innocents or conspiracy theories about Jews.  British universities are a meeting place of different nationalities and ethnic and faith groups.  The boycott campaign, anti-Israel motions, double standards and violent rhetoric poison this precious environment."

Cesarani rejected suggestions that incidents such as the attack on a Kosher shop in Paris following the Charlie Hebdo shooting in January 2015 were a sign of universal anti-Semitism.  He wrote that "The current hysteria about the 'rise of anti-semitism' and the flight of Jews from Europe is deeply regrettable.  There is no 'wave' of anti-semitism."  The basis of his argument was that Jews were not socially or legally isolated "as they were in the 1930s and 1940s, but find themselves enjoying unprecedented solidarity."  He further emphasised that Jewish communities "on both sides of the English Channel rallied and continued to thrive" following targeted attacks by Palestinian Arab terrorists in the 1970s and 1980s and wrote that the "current press hyperbole shows not only ignorance about what the situation was like 70–80 years ago, but what it was like just 20–30 years before now."  He also attacked Israeli Prime Minister Benjamin Netanyahu for "fear mongering" and asserted that Jews, non-Jews and Muslims were standing "shoulder to shoulder" against a common terrorist threat.

He saw the controversy over the Israeli West Bank barrier as being unimportant, and that it is used as a photo opportunity for the world's media.  Of the wall itself "it's a concern if land is misappropriated from the Palestinians, or if Palestinian lives become intolerable, but its true significance is in the total disintegration of trust between Jews and Palestinians", though he also believed some reactions to the barrier have been under-reported, for example that "some Arab towns, especially in southern Galilee, have welcomed the wall as a means of preventing Palestinians entering Israeli towns and adding to the unemployment and instability."

Death
David Cesarani died on 25 October 2015, after he had had surgery the previous month to remove a cancerous spinal tumour.  He had been diagnosed with the cancer in July 2015.  He spent the week before his operation checking the footnotes for his final book at the Institute of Historical Research in London, and was still writing ten days before his death.  He had completed two works which were both scheduled to be published in 2016: Final Solution: The Fate of the Jews 1933–1949 and Disraeli: The Novel Politician.

Bibliography

As author
 Justice Delayed: How Britain Became a Refuge for Nazi War Criminals (Heinemann, 1992) Reissued by Phoenix Press in 2001.  
 The Jewish Chronicle and Anglo-Jewry 1841–1991 (Cambridge University Press, 1994)  
 Arthur Koestler: The Homeless Mind. (Heinemann, 1998) Reissued by the Free Press.  
 Eichmann: His Life and Crimes, which was published in the USA under the title: Becoming Eichmann: Rethinking the Life, Crimes, and Trial of a "Desk Murderer" (Da Capo Press, 2006) 
 Major Farran's Hat: The Untold Story of the Struggle to Establish the Jewish State (Da Capo Press, 2009) 
 Final Solution: The Fate of the Jews 1933–1949 (Macmillan, 2016) 
 Disraeli: The Novel Politician (Jewish Lives, Yale University Press, 2016)

As editor
 Port Jews (2002)
The Making of Modern Anglo-Jewry (1990)
 The Final Solution: Origins and Implementation (1994)
 Genocide and Rescue: The Holocaust in Hungary, 1944 (1997)
 Port Jews: Jewish Communities in Cosmopolitan Maritime Trading Centuries, 1550–1950 (2002)
 "Bystanders" to the Holocaust: A Re-evaluation (2002)
 Citizenship, Nationality and Migration in Europe (with Mary Fulbrook 2003, first ed. 1996)
 Holocaust. Critical Concepts in Historical Studies. 6 vols. (2004)

Awards 

 2006: National Jewish Book Award in the History category for Becoming Eichmann: Rethinking the Life, Crimes, and Trial of a "Desk Murderer"

References

Sources
Stone, Dan (2019) British Jewry, antisemitism and the Holocaust: the work and legacy of David Cesarani: an introduction, Patterns of Prejudice, 53:1, 2-8, DOI:10.1080/0031322X.2018.1557962

External links
 Page on Professor David Cesarani at the RHUL History Department website
 
 Review of Cesarani's biography of Adolf Eichmann
 Book Review, A World Without Jews: The Nazi Imagination from Persecution to Genocide – Fathom Journal

1956 births
2015 deaths
Academics of Queen Mary University of London
Academics of Royal Holloway, University of London
Academics of the University of Leeds
Academics of the University of Southampton
Alumni of Queens' College, Cambridge
Alumni of St Antony's College, Oxford
Columbia Graduate School of Arts and Sciences alumni
English Jews
English historians
Historians of the Holocaust
Jewish German history
Jewish historians
Officers of the Order of the British Empire
People educated at Latymer Upper School
Academics from London
Scholars of antisemitism